Murugadoss Arunasalam (born 25 September 1974), commonly known as A. R. Murugadoss, is an Indian film director, producer and screenwriter who predominantly works in the Tamil film industry. He is best known for directing action films mainly on social issues. In addition, he has worked in Telugu films and Hindi films. Murugadoss won the Filmfare Award for Best Director for his 2014 Tamil action drama Kaththi.

Murugadoss' first break in the film industry was as an assistant director of Ratchagan (1997). He then worked with S. J. Surya for the film Kushi (2000) before directing his first film, the Ajith starrer Dheena (2001). His first Bollywood film was Ghajini (2008), a Hindi remake of his Tamil film of the same name. It became the first Bollywood film to gross over  domestically. He would then go on to direct 7am Arivu in 2011, which would become the first non-Rajini 100cr grosser in Tamil cinema. In 2012, he directed the action thriller Thuppakki, starring Vijay, which became the third Tamil film to gross 100 crore at the domestic box office alone. He worked with Vijay again with the box office hits Kaththi and Sarkar (2018).

Personal life
Murugadoss was born in Kallakurichi, Tamil Nadu. The initials "AR" refer to his father's name Arunasalam and were added after Murugadoss signed his first film, Dheena, in 2001. Murugadoss currently resides in Virugambakkam, Chennai. Murugadoss had his schooling at the Government Higher Secondary School and studied BA in Bishop Heber College, Tiruchirapalli. His brother, Dileepan made his acting debut with Vathikuchi, which is Murugadoss' production venture.

Career

During his college days, Murugadoss was active in cultural events, particularly in mimicry and drawing. He subsequently became a cinephile watching up to seven films a week in his hometown and started writing jokes as well. After Ananda Vikatan published them, Murugadoss began to think of becoming a story writer. At Bharathidasan University he started to write sketch comedies and acted in them. After college he tried to join the Madras Film Institute, but was rejected. Nevertheless, Murugadoss stayed in Chennai in multiple functions. First he became an assistant writer of P. Kalaimani and wrote dialogues for the Tamil film Madurai Meenakshi. He became assistant director of Ratchagan (1997) for half of the film and continued as assistant script director for the Telugu film Kalusukundam Ra. Murugadoss then worked with S. J. Surya for the film Kushi.

In 2003, he contemplated making a film titled Varathan with Vikram in the lead role for producer Oscar Ravichandran, but later moved on to other projects.

S. J. Suryah recommended Murugadoss to Ajith Kumar for directing his debut film, Dheena. His next films were Ramana, Ghajini, and Stalin. His fifth film was Ghajini, which was a Hindi remake of his same-titled 2005 film and marked his Bollywood debut. It released on 25 December 2008 and became the first Bollywood film to gross over 100 crore domestically. His next Tamil film 7aum Arivu, was released on Diwali 2011 and was more successful outside India than in Tamil Nadu. Murugadoss signed a deal with Fox Star Studios to produce two Tamil films.

In 2012, he directed the action thriller Thuppakki, starring Vijay and produced by S. Dhanu released on Diwali 2012 to mostly positive reviews and became the fourth Tamil film to enter the 100 crore club after Enthiran. Thuppakki collected over 180 crores as reported by producer. He also directed the Hindi remake of the film, Holiday: A Soldier Is Never Off Duty. In 2014, he was the writer and producer for the fantasy film Maan Karate starring Sivakarthikeyan which was directed by his former assistant Thirukumaran.

In 2014, he directed the action drama Kaththi starring Vijay and produced by Lyca Productions released on Diwali 2014 and emerged as one of the top-grossing films in Kollywood for 2014, collecting an estimated 131 crores. In 2016, he directed Akira starring Sonakshi Sinha. It is a remake of Tamil film Mouna Guru. Then, he directed Spyder starring Mahesh Babu and Rakul Preet Singh. He joined with Vijay once again for the movie Sarkar which is produced by Sun Pictures Kalanithi Maran which released on 6 November 2018 for the Diwali. It released in over 3000 screens around the world. The next, his film Darbar starring Rajinikanth was released on 9 January 2020.

Filmography 

As director, producer, and writer

As actor
Poochudava (1997)
7am Arivu (2011)
Thuppakki (2012)
Maan Karate (2014)
Kaththi (2014)
Isai (2015)
NOTA (2018)
Sarkar (2018)

Awards

References

External links
 
 
 

Tamil film directors
Tamil-language film directors
Tamil screenwriters
Living people
Filmfare Awards South winners
Tamil Nadu State Film Awards winners
People from Viluppuram district
Film producers from Tamil Nadu
21st-century Indian film directors
Film directors from Tamil Nadu
Screenwriters from Tamil Nadu
1974 births